Christmas in the Park is a winter event that takes place each year in downtown San Jose, California, roughly from the last week of November to January 1. During this time, more than five hundred Christmas trees decorated by local schools and other groups are displayed in Plaza de César Chávez Park, usually with more than 50 Christmas-related musical and animated exhibits, a 55-foot high Community Giving Tree, and many souvenir and treats shops. 

The event is attended by more than 700,000 visitors each year, and has been taking place in Plaza de César Chávez for more than 30 years. It is described as "San Jose's biggest production." The event brings an estimated $13 million in visitor spending to the city. It is free to the public, although donations to help offset its costs are suggested.

Next to the park there is an ice rink and about a dozen rides for children during this time, which include a Ferris wheel, merry-go-round and train ride.

In 2020, due to the COVID-19 pandemic, Christmas in the Park pivoted to a drive-through event at San Jose's History Park, from November 27, 2020 - January 3, 2021, open from 4-10 PM, with advance tickets required. Over 160,000 new lights in the form of lighted tunnels, snowflake arches, pixel light forests and other displays have been added to the traditional displays and decorated trees.

History
The Christmas in the Park event traces its origin to the Nativity display built by Don Lima in the 1950s in front of his Lima Family Mortuary in Willow Glen. The exhibit attracted attention and he began adding more displays, and as they grew, there were more and more visitors. 

In the 1970s, after the exhibits grew quite big he donated them to the City of San Jose. For a while they were set up on the lawn of where San Jose's original City Hall used to be, at the intersection of First and Mission Streets. The City of San Jose and a non-profit (Christmas in the Park Inc) worked together to put on this 2.5 acre holiday celebration.  

The event was moved to Plaza de César Chávez in the early 1980s.

In 2011 the City could no longer afford to manage or raise funds for the event and it was scheduled to be closed. The non-profit stood up and took over the event and have increased attendance each year since – reaching over 700,000 in 2017.

Gallery

References

Tourist attractions in San Jose, California
Events in California
Christmas in California